In Flight  may refer to:
In Flight (Alvin Lee album)
In Flight (Linda Perry album)
In Flight (George Benson album)
 In Flight, an album by Design (UK band)